Nuvar may refer to:
 Nuvar-e Bala
 Nuvar-e Pain